Ross Sutherland (4 August 1937 – 4 January 1989) was an  Australian rules footballer who played with Geelong in the Victorian Football League (VFL).

Notes

External links 

1937 births
1989 deaths
Australian rules footballers from Victoria (Australia)
Geelong Football Club players
Colac Football Club players
People educated at Geelong College